The 2017 Auburn Tigers softball team is an American softball team, representing Auburn University for the 2017 NCAA softball season. The Auburn Tigers play their home games at Jane B. Moore Field.

The Tigers 2017 regular season finished in 2nd place within the conference, and received the 2nd seed in the  2017 SEC softball tournament.

Roster
2017 Auburn Softball Roster

Coaching staff

Schedule 
2017 Auburn Tigers Softball Schedule

|-
!colspan=9| Triple Crown Tournament

|-
!colspan=9|

|-
!colspan=9| Plainsman Invitational

|-
!colspan=9|

|-
!colspan=9| Tiger Invitational

|-
!colspan=9|

|-
!colspan=9|Wilson/DeMarini Classic

|-
!colspan=9|

|-
!colspan=9|USF Tournament

|-
!colspan=9|

|-
!colspan=9| 2017 Southeastern Conference softball tournament

|-
!colspan=9|  NCAA Regionals

|-
!colspan=9|  NCAA Super Regionals

 The second game of the series vs. LSU was postponed due to bad weather.  The game, which was originally scheduled for March 11 at 7:30 PM, was moved to March 12 at 12:00 PM as part of a doubleheader.

Ranking movement

References

Auburn
Auburn Tigers softball seasons
Auburn